Rapdalus kapuri is a moth in the family Cossidae. It was described by G. S. Arora in 1976. It is found in India's Anadaman Islands.

References

Zeuzerinae
Moths described in 1976